Ja imam talenat! (Serbian Cyrillic: Ја имам таленат!, translation: I have talent!) is a Serbian television series, format of Got Talent series. It is hosted by Vladimir Aleksić and Ivana Bajić. Judges have included Ana Nikolic, Srđan Žika Todorović, Stefan Đurić Rasta, Ivan Tasovac, Nataša Ninković, Ivan Bosiljčić, Danica Maksimović, Aleksandar Milić Mili and Mina Lazarević. The show debuted on 12 September 2009. A total of five series have been broadcast. The first and fifth series were broadcast on RTV Pink while the other series were broadcast by Serbian public service broadcaster RTS.

Format
The format for Ja imam talenat! is the same as most Got Talent shows: acts first audition in front of the producers, and later in front of the judges and live audience.

Contestants are interviewed by the show hosts, and then they go on the stage where they talk a bit in front of the judges, usually introducing them to their act. Each of the judges has a buzzer in front of them, and if they don't like the performance, they can hit it. If an act receives all three buzzers their time on the stage is over; after that the judges give their reason for buzzing (and usually all three of them give an act a 'no'). If an act receives two or less buzzers, they can continue their performance, after which the judges comment on it, and vote. The majority vote decides if the contestants proceed in the competition: if an act gets two or more 'yeses' they're through to the next round, while two or more 'noes' means they leave the competition. After an act leaves the stage, they are interviewed by the show hosts once more.

After all the auditions, judges have to pick top forty from all the acts that they've sent through. The top forty, usually referred to as the semi-finalists, are divided into five groups of eight acts, and they compete in live shows for the public vote. During semi-final shows, public gets to vote their favourite three acts of the night. The act with the most votes goes directly to the final, while second act is voted on by the judges from the other two acts that got the top votes.

I ja imam talenat!
During the second season a companion show was made, called I ja imam talenat (meaning: I have talent as well!). It is hosted by Una Senić.

It is broadcast on a daily basis, and it focuses on the contestants seen during that week's main show.  The contestants are usually interviewed back in their hometowns, and talk about their everyday life, and how they develop their talents. The show also features some of the auditions that have not made the weekly show.

During the semifinals and the final, the show gives a backstage look to all of the performances, and how the producers and acts come up with performances.

First season (2009)
For the first season, over 2500 acts applied, and the auditions were held in three cities: Belgrade, Novi Sad and Niš. Even though most of the acts were from Serbia, there were some contestants that came from Croatia and Macedonia.

Finalists:

Second season (2011)

Auditions for the second season were held in late August and during the first days of September 2010. Over 4000 acts applied, and the auditions took place in 4 cities: Belgrade, Novi Sad, Niš and Kragujevac.

Even though there were rumors that the judging panel would change, it stayed the same. The first episode was set to be aired on 18 October 2010, but the broadcast was indefinitely delayed. The following April show host Vladimir Aleksić announced that the second season would start on April 17, 2011, on RTS. By 4 June 2011, nine shows of auditions were broadcast and the semi-finals were set to start on 11 June 2011.

This was the first season that a companion show was produced and broadcast (I ja imam talenat!); the same format of the companion show was kept for the later series. The series was won by a pair of deaf dancers, Milica and Nenad. In 2012, Nenad was featured in Željko Joksimović's video for Nije Ljubav Stvar, song that would represent Serbia in the 2012 Eurovision Song Contest.

Third season (2011–2012)

Soon after the second series ended, applications for the third series were opened.

For the third series, the judging panel was altered - Danica Maksimović is replaced with Mina Lazarević. The press reported that Danica and the production company couldn't reach an agreement on how much she would be paid for doing the show, so it was decided that Mina would take her place.

Th series premiere was on 20 November 2011. For the first time the series logo was changed. The new logo resembled the logo used by the fifth series of the British version of the show, with a slightly altered colour scheme.

Producers of the third season decided to increase online promotion of the show, and for the first time they made an official YouTube, Facebook and Twitter account for the series.

The series winners were Bojana and Nikola Peković—siblings who originally performed individually, but were put together by the producers before they were put through the semi-finals.

On the day of the series final, online application forms were opened for the next series. Two weeks after the final, Mili announced that he would not be coming back as a judge for the fourth series. Press speculation identified Anica Dobra as a possible replacement for Mili and suggested producers were considering renewing the entire judging panel.

Fourth season (2012–2013)

During the previous season final, application forms were put online. Over 400 acts applied on the night of the final. For two weeks, auditionees were able to apply via the show's Facebook page, after which time applications were made possible via text message and web registration. Producers announced that they might go scouting for acts that would not apply themselves.

On 29 August, the official Facebook page of the show published photos along with the caption "pre-auditions are in progress", referring to the producer auditions. Around that time, rumors started circulating that Mina had left the judging panel. Later on it was confirmed that she and Mili would be replaced by Nataša Ninković and Ivan Bosiljčić.

The first episode of the fourth series was broadcast on 18 November 2012.

Fifth season (2016–2017)

The broadcasting of the show returned to RTV Pink for the fifth season. The winner of the season was Bar Strong, a boy band from Serbia.

References 

 
Serbian talent shows
RTV Pink original programming
2009 Serbian television series debuts
Serbian-language television shows
Television series by Fremantle (company)
Non-British television series based on British television series